Circulation may refer to:

Science and technology
 Atmospheric circulation, the large-scale movement of air
 Circulation (physics), the path integral of the fluid velocity around a closed curve in a fluid flow field
 Circulatory system, a biological organ system whose primary function is to move substances to and from cells
 Circulation problem, a generalization of network flow problems
 Circulation (architecture), the flow of people through a building
 Circulation (currency), all currency held by consumers and businesses, but not by financial institutions and governments
 Exhaust gas recirculation, a nitrogen oxide reduction technique used in most gasoline and diesel engines
 Library circulation, the activities around the lending of library books and other material to users of a lending library
 Rhetorical circulation, the ways that texts and discourses move through time and space

Other uses
 Newspaper circulation, the average number of copies of a newspaper distributed on a day
 Magazine circulation, the average number of copies of a periodical distributed per edition/ volume
 Circulation Festival, an annual circus and fire performance festival held in Dunedin, New Zealand
 Circulation (film), a 2008 psychological thriller-fantasy film by Ryan Harper
 Circulation (journal), a journal published by the American Heart Association